The order Cephalaspidea, also known as the  headshield slugs and bubble snails, is a major taxon of sea slugs and bubble snails, marine gastropod mollusks within the larger clade Euopisthobranchia. Bubble shells is another common name for these families of marine gastropods, some of which have thin bubble-like shells. This clade contains more than 600 species.

Members of this worldwide clade used to be considered the most primitive of the opisthobranchs, but now they are considered as derived and specialized members of the Euthyneura Spengel, 1881. 

Headshield slugs are the most morphologically diverse group of all the opisthobranchs.

Anatomy
The vast majority possess a shell, although it may be reduced or internal. They have a well-developed headshield, a characteristic broadening at the head, which is used to plow beneath the surface of the sand. This headshield prevents the sand entering the mantle cavity. There is a muscular foot with or without parapodia (fleshy wing-like flaps).

Life habits and related anatomical structures
Headshield slugs often live just beneath the surface of the sand and can also be seen crawling on rocks. They have well-developed sensory structures to detect prey, which may be other opisthobranchs, polychaetes or bristleworms and foraminiferans. Several species are voracious carnivores.

Members of the brightly colored genus Chelidonura also have well-developed eyes on the anterior end of the head and bundles of sensory cilia around the mouth. With these cilia they are able to track their prey by following the victim’s mucous trail.

The Hancock's organ is a chemosensory organ situated between the foot and the headshield. It plays a role in olfactory and sensory detection. It is visible as a dark brown pit at the base of the right rhinophore.

Taxonomy 
The taxonomy of the shelled cephalaspideans, the bubble snails, like that of many shelled mollusks, used to be based very simply on shell characteristics. But because there are some similarities in shell morphology throughout this group, more recently taxonomists have taken other anatomical characteristics into consideration, such as the radula, gizzard, penis, and Hancock’s organ.

In 2015 a new study based on molecular phylogenetics has changed significantly the taxonomy of the Cephalaspidea. The monophyly of the Cephalaspidea was confirmed, but the families Cylichnidae, Diaphanidae, Haminoeidae, Philinidae, and Retusidae were found non-monophyletic. This had led to the creation of new families ((Alacuppidae, Colinatydidae, Colpodaspididae, Mnestiidae, Philinorbidae) ) and one new genus (Alacuppa).  Two family names (Acteocinidae, Laonidae) and two genera (Laona, Philinorbis) are reinstated as valid

Linnaean taxonomy 

 Suborder Cephalaspidea P. Fischer, 1883
 Superfamily Acteonoidea D'Orbigny, 1835
 Superfamily Bulloidea Lamarck, 1801
 Superfamily Cylindrobulloidea Thiele, 1931 - These are now included in the suborder Sacoglossa
 Superfamily Diaphanoidea Odhner, 1914
 Superfamily Haminoeoidea Pilsbry, 1895
 Superfamily Philinoidea J.E. Gray, 1850
 Superfamily Ringiculoidea Philippi, 1853

2005 taxonomy 
In the taxonomy of Bouchet & Rocroi (2005), the clade Cephalaspidea is arranged as follows:
 Superfamily Bulloidea: family Bullidae
 Superfamily Diaphanoidea: families Diaphanidae and Notodiaphanidae,
 Superfamily Haminoeoidea: families Haminoeidae, Bullactidae and Smaragdinellidae
 Superfamily Philinoidea: families Philinidae, Aglajidae, Cylichnidae, Gastropteridae, Philinoglossidae, Plusculidae and Retusidae
 Superfamily Runcinoidea: families Runcinidae and Ilbiidae

The  superfamily Acteonoidea has been included into the new Informal Group "Lower Heterobranchia" and  the superfamily Cylindrobulloidea becomes part of the Group Cylindrobullida.

2009 taxonomy 
Malaquias et al. (2009) have rearranged taxonomy of Cephalaspidea sensu lato:
 reinstated Architectibranchia
 reinstated Runcinacea as a valid name outside Cephalaspidea.
 reinstated Scaphandridae as a valid family.
 they did not use superfamilies in the classification scheme.

The taxonomy of Cephalaspidea sensu lato by Malaquias et al. (2009) is arranged as follows (there are listed genera under molecular analysis; not analyzed families are under "incertae sedis"):

Architectibranchia Haszprunar, 1985
 Family Acteonidae d’Orbigny, 1843 - Acteon, Mexacteon, Pupa
 Family Aplustridae Gray, 1847 - Hydatina, Micromelo
 Family Bullinidae Gray, 1850 incertae sedis
 Family Ringiculidae Philippi, 1853 incertae sedis
 Family Notodiaphanidae Thiele, 1931 incertae sedis

Runcinacea Burn, 1963
 Family Runcinidae H. Adams & A. Adams, 1854 - Runcina
 Family Ilbiidae Burn, 1963 incertae sedis

Cephalaspidea Fischer, 1887 - This means Cephalaspidea sensu stricto
 Family Diaphanidae Odhner, 1914 - Diaphana, genus Colpodaspis is incertae sedis
 Family Cylichnidae H. Adams & A. Adams, 1854 - Cylichna
 Family Scaphandridae G. O Sars, 1878 - Scaphander
 Family Retusidae Thiele, 1925 - Retusa, Pyrunculus
 Family Rhizoridae Dell, 1952 - Volvulella
 Family Bullidae Gray, 1827 - Bulla
 Family Philinidae Gray, 1850 - Philine
 Family Aglajidae Pilsbry, 1895–96 - Aglaja, Chelidonura, Navanax, Odontoglaja, Philinopsis
 Family Philinoglossidae Hertling, 1932 - Philinoglossa
 Family Gastropteridae Swainson, 1840 - Gastropteron, Sagaminopteron, Siphopteron
 Family Plusculidae Odhner, 1968 incertae sedis
 Family Haminoeidae Pilsbry, 1893 - Atys, Haminoea, Phanerophthalmus, Smaragdinella, Ventomnestia incertae sedis
 Family Bullactidae Thiele, 1826 incertae sedis

2010 taxonomy 
Subsequently Malaquias (2010) moved Bullacta exarata (formerly the only member of Bullactidae) into the family Haminoeidae.

Jörger et al. (2010) moved Cephalaspidea sensu stricto and Runcinacea into the Euopisthobranchia and they confirmed the placement of Acteonoidea within the Lower Heterobranchia. All families of Architectibranchia were already within the Lower Heterobranchia in the taxonomy of Bouchet & Rocroi, except for the Notodiaphanidae, which has been placed in the Lower Heterobranchia since 2010, in order that the Architectibranchia can be considered to be monophyletic.

2015 taxonomy
The publication by Oskars T.R., Bouchet P. & Malaquias M.A. (2015). A new phylogeny of the Cephalaspidea (Gastropoda: Heterobranchia) based on expanded taxon sampling and gene markers. in the journal Molecular Phylogenetics and Evolution. 89 came to the following conclusion, with the creation of new families 
 Acteocinidae Dall, 1913 - type genus: Acteocina Gray, 1847
 Alacuppidae Oskars, Bouchet, and Malaquias, 2015 - type genus: Alacuppa Oskars, Bouchet, and Malaquias, 2015
 Mnestiidae Oskars, Bouchet, and Malaquias, 2015 - type genus: Mnestia H. Adams and A. Adams, 1854
 Colpodaspididae Oskars, Bouchet, and Malaquias, 2015 - type genus: Colpodaspis M. Sars, 1870
 Colinatydidae Oskars, Bouchet, and Malaquias, 2015 - type genus: Colinatys Ortea, Moro and Espinosa, 2013
 Philinorbidae Oskars, Bouchet, and Malaquias, 2015 - type genus: Philinorbis Habe, 1950
 Laonidae Pruvot-Fol, 1954 (formerly Laoninae) - type genus: Laona A. Adams, 1865
 [unassigned] Cephalaspidea (temporary name) with the genera Cylichnium Dall, 1908, Micratys Habe, 1952 and Noalda Iredale, 1936.

The superfamily  Bulloidea was not supported in the Bayesian phylogenetic hypothesis and Diaphanoidea was found polyphyletic. The superfamilies Haminoeoidea and Philinoidea were accepted. The composition of each of the superfamilies was drastically rearranged.

References

  Oskars T.R., Bouchet P. & Malaquias M.A. (2015). A new phylogeny of the Cephalaspidea (Gastropoda: Heterobranchia) based on expanded taxon sampling and gene markers. Molecular Phylogenetics and Evolution. 89: 130-150

External links 

 

Protostome unranked clades